Stachowo may refer to the following places in Poland:

Stachowo, Piaseczno County in Masovian Voivodeship (east-central Poland)
Stachowo, Płońsk County in Masovian Voivodeship (east-central Poland)
Stachowo, Pomeranian Voivodeship (north Poland)